Stephen Fox (born 1938), is an author and Emeritus Professor of American History at Humboldt State University, Arcata, California. (Assistant professor, 1969–1973, Associate Professor, 1973–1977 and Professor, 1977–1999). He has written articles and books on the subjects of relocation and internment of European Americans in the United States during World War II, as well as the roundup of enemy nationals in Latin America.

Relocation describes World War II government restrictions on Italians living in coastal areas of the United States, including suicides and hardships faced by internees. Internment refers to the FBI roundup of 'enemy aliens' throughout the United States. These works also compare and contrast government policy relating to Italians and Germans with the misnamed and misunderstood "internment" of Japanese Americans. 

Fox is also the author of a handful of novels.

Sources
 US Library of Congress catalog

References

American male writers
1938 births
Humboldt State University faculty
Living people
American Book Award winners